Albert Ionuț Popa (born 5 April 1999) is a Romanian professional footballer who plays as a goalkeeper for Liga III side Gloria Buzău. Popa made his debut at senior level in the Liga II for Dacia Unirea Brăila, then playing in the third tier for Unirea Slobozia and SR Brașov, before signing with Gaz Metan.

Honours
Odorheiu Secuiesc
Liga III: 2021–22

References

External links
 
 

1999 births
Living people
Sportspeople from Brașov
Romanian footballers
Association football goalkeepers
Liga I players
Liga II players
Liga III players
CS Gaz Metan Mediaș players
AFC Dacia Unirea Brăila players
AFC Unirea Slobozia players
SR Brașov players
FC Dunărea Călărași players
FC Gloria Buzău players